I've Gotta Be Me is a 1968 studio album by Sammy Davis Jr. The album includes covers of three songs from the musical Sweet Charity.

Track listing
 "I've Gotta Be Me" (Walter Marks) – 2:58
 "My Personal Property" (Cy Coleman and Dorothy Fields) – 2:26
 "I'm Glad There Is You" (Jimmy Dorsey and Paul Mertz) – 2:30
 "Here I'll Stay" (Alan Jay Lerner, Kurt Weill) – 3:10
 "I'm a Brass Band" (Cy Coleman and Dorothy Fields) – 1:35
 "If My Friends Could See Me Now" (Cy Coleman and Dorothy Fields) – 2:42
 "I've Got You Under My Skin" (Cole Porter) – 2:26
 "Somebody" (Sid Wayne, Ben Weisman) – 2:26
 "She Believes in Me" (Baker Knight) – 2:55
 "Sweet November" (Leslie Bricusse, Anthony Newley) – 2:39

Personnel
 Sammy Davis Jr. – vocals
 Richard Wess – arranger

References

1968 albums
Sammy Davis Jr. albums
Reprise Records albums
Albums produced by Jimmy Bowen